Aglossia (aglossia congenita) is a congenital defect resulting in a partial development or complete absence of a tongue.

Aglossia is commonly associated with craniofacial and limb defects (Adactylia syndrome) and is thought to belong to a family of oromandibular limb hypogenesis syndrome (OLHS). It is believed to be caused by heat-induced vascular disruption near the fourth week of embryonic development.

The first known case was reported in the early 18th century by a member of the prominent De Jussieu family in France and cases to this day remain rare.

References

External links
 Experience: I was born without a tongue, Kelly Rogers, The Guardian, 1 December 2017.

Congenital disorders of digestive system
Congenital oral disorders
Tongue disorders